= TV phone =

TV phone can refer to:

- a contemporary UMTS-type Mobile phone, a form of videotelephony that can convey simultaneous audio and video, or
- an archaic term for the original Videophone (video telephone)
